Gaasyendietha, according to Seneca mythology, is a giant serpent that dwells in the deep areas of rivers and lakes of Canada, especially Lake Ontario. This serpent could fly on a trail of fire, and it could also spew fire, which has led to it being viewed as analogous to European dragons.

It is also known as the 'meteor dragon', in reference to its supposed origin from a meteoroid that had impacted the Earth. It is also capable of crossing the heavens on a trail of fire.

In the tale "Ganyadjigowa", the hero Ganyadjigowa (The Mudhen) was killed by Gaasyendietha, in the form of an old man.

References

External links

 Toronto Urban Legends: The Great Serpent of Lake Ontario

Dragons
Iroquois legendary creatures
Canadian legendary creatures
Water monsters
Sea serpents